The Division of Wimmera was an Australian electoral division in the state of Victoria. It was named after the Wimmera region in which it was located. It originally encompassed the towns of Mildura, Swan Hill and Warracknabeal, but by the time it was abolished in 1977, it had drifted south and grown smaller to only include Ararat, Horsham and Maryborough. The division was proclaimed in 1900, and was one of the original 65 divisions to be contested at the first federal election. It was abolished at the redistribution of 31 October 1977.

Members

Election results

1901 establishments in Australia
Constituencies established in 1901
1977 disestablishments in Australia
Constituencies disestablished in 1977
Former electoral divisions of Australia